Uridine diphosphate N-acetylglucosamine or UDP-GlcNAc is a nucleotide sugar and a coenzyme in metabolism. It is used by glycosyltransferases to transfer N-acetylglucosamine residues to substrates. D-Glucosamine is made naturally in the form of glucosamine-6-phosphate, and is the biochemical precursor of all nitrogen-containing sugars. To be specific, glucosamine-6-phosphate is synthesized from fructose 6-phosphate and glutamine as the first step of the hexosamine biosynthesis pathway.  The end-product of this pathway is UDP-GlcNAc, which is then used for making glycosaminoglycans, proteoglycans, and glycolipids.

UDP-GlcNAc is extensively involved in intracellular signaling as a substrate for O-linked N-acetylglucosamine transferases (OGTs) to install the O-GlcNAc post-translational modification in a wide range of species. It is also involved in nuclear pore formation and nuclear signalling. OGTs and OG-ases play an important role in the structure of the cytoskeleton. In mammals, there is enrichment of OGT transcripts in the pancreas beta-cells, and  UDP-GlcNAc is thought to be part of the glucose sensing mechanism. There is also evidence that it plays a part in insulin sensitivity in other cells. In plants, it is involved in the control of gibberellin production.

Clostridium novyi type A alpha-toxin is an O-linked N-actetylglucosamine transferase acting on Rho proteins and causing the collapse of the cytoskeleton.

References

Metabolism
Coenzymes